Boggs Island is an island on the Ohio River in Marshall County, West Virginia between the cities of Bellaire, Ohio and Wheeling, West Virginia. It is a small island near the Ohio shore opposite the mouth of Boggs Run, from which it may take its name. Strip mine companies removed every mature tree on this island in the 1980s.

See also 
List of islands of West Virginia

River islands of West Virginia
Landforms of Marshall County, West Virginia
Islands of the Ohio River